Troy Hayden is the weekday morning news anchor for Fox 10 News in Phoenix, Arizona. He has been an anchor at the station since 1994, serving as weeknight 10pm anchor for nearly 20 years. He made the move to mornings in August 2016.

He started his media career as a sports writer at the Sacramento Bee, then worked in television in Sacramento, Eureka, and Reno. He graduated from Sacramento State University. He has been named Anchor of the Year by the Associated Press. He is also a five time Emmy winner as "Best Anchor," has been named "Best 10pm Anchor" by Phoenix Magazine, and "Best Live Reporter" by the Phoenix New Times.

References 

Living people
Year of birth missing (living people)
California State University, Sacramento alumni